Naul or NAUL may refer to:
Naul, Dublin, a village in north County Dublin, Ireland
Naul (singer) (born 1978), South Korean soul singer, member of Brown Eyed Soul
National Amalgamated Union of Labour, in the United Kingdom

See also
Willie Naulls, American basketball player